The Northwestern Pacific Railroad  is a regional shortline railroad utilizing a  stretch of the 271 mile mainline between Schellville and Windsor with freight and Sonoma–Marin Area Rail Transit (SMART) commuter trains. Formerly, it was a regional railroad primarily used for logging that served the entire North Coast of California, with a main line running  from Schellville to Eureka, along with an additional portion of the line running from the Ignacio Wye to the edge of San Rafael. The "Southern End" of the line, including Schellville to Willits and from Ignacio to San Rafael is owned by SMART, while the "Northern End" was formally owned and managed by the now-dissolved North Coast Railroad Authority but is now saved for use in California's 2018 Great Redwood Trail Act, which repurposes the unused railroad right-of-way from Eureka to Willits for future use as the Great Redwood Trail.

History 
In the late 1800s both the Southern Pacific Railroad (“SP”) and the Atchison, Topeka and Santa Fe Railway (“AT&SF”) had great interests in building lines north from San Francisco to Humboldt County to transport lumber south. The Southern Pacific Railroad controlled the southern end of the line from Willits south to Marin and Schellville, while the AT&SF controlled line south from Eureka through Humboldt County. Both railroads planned to build a line north, the AT&SF starting with a boat connection in present-day Larkspur, California, and the Southern Pacific, starting at its interchange in American Canyon, north through Napa, Sonoma, Mendocino and Humboldt counties to finally terminate in Eureka, California. As plans went forward it became clear that only one railroad would be profitable serving Mendocino and Humboldt Counties, so the Southern Pacific and Santa Fe entered into a joint agreement, and in 1906 merged 42 railroad companies between Marin and Humboldt Bay to create one railroad line stretching from Sausalito to Eureka. Completion of the project was disrupted by the 1906 San Francisco earthquake; plans and right-of-way documents were destroyed in the subsequent fire.  After a time-expedient "punt" of the route through the unstable Eel River Canyon, construction was finally completed in October 1914 when a "golden spike" ceremony and celebration was held to mark the accomplishment. There were also dozens of miles of narrow-gauge trackage in Marin and Sonoma Counties.

The railroad used ferries of San Francisco Bay for freight transfer until connected to the national rail network at Napa Junction by the Santa Rosa and Carquinez Railroad in 1888. The Santa Rosa and Carquinez remained part of SP independent of the NWP with a primary freight interchange at Schellville. SP's Santa Rosa branch continued from Schellville through Sonoma to a separate terminal yard on North Street in Santa Rosa. Freight interchange was predominantly through Ignacio, but there was a second connection to the SP in Santa Rosa until the line through the Valley of the Moon was abandoned in 1935.
 
The railroad service became popular; an early daily NWP timetable shows 10 passenger trains each way, plus dozens of freights.  The rail line soon replaced steam schooners as the main means of getting lumber from Humboldt County to market.  Rail service to inland areas facilitated local development of the lumber industry.
 
In 1929 the AT&SF sold its half-interest to the Southern Pacific, making the NWP a full SP subsidiary.

The SP era 

 
Passenger service boomed until the 1930s, when improved roads and highways made traveling and shipping by motor vehicle more accessible. By 1935 freight and passenger service diminished because of the Great Depression.  With the onset of World War II, freight shipments rose while passenger service remained constant. Freight service on the NWP increased in the 1950s owing to an increase in lumber demand due to the post-war housing boom.

Branch lines were dismantled during the 1930s.  The Sebastopol branch became redundant following purchase of the Petaluma and Santa Rosa Railroad in 1932, and California State Route 12 adopted the former alignment between Leddy and Sebastopol.  The Trinidad extension reverted to a logging line after NWP service ended in 1933.  Sonoma County's River Road adopted the former alignment of the Guerneville branch from Fulton to Duncans Mills after rails were removed in 1935.

Diesels were being used on all trains by 1953, with the exception of ten-wheelers number 181 and 183 pulling passenger trains numbered 3 and 4 between San Rafael and Eureka with number 182 on standby. The #3/#4 trains offered sleeping cars, a cafe-lounge in addition to coach cars. Passengers from San Francisco would take Greyhound Buses from the San Francisco Ferry Building at the base of Market Street to San Rafael. NWP locomotives 112, 140, 141, 143, and 178 plus SP numbers 2345, 2356, 2564, 2582, and 2810 were stored at Tiburon for emergency use; but steam power had disappeared by 1955. On November 10, 1958, all mainline passenger service was discontinued south of Willits. The only remaining service was a tri-weekly Willits-Eureka round trip, operated by a single Budd Rail Diesel Car, which ran until April 30, 1971. When Amtrak took over intercity passenger rail service on May 1, 1971, it did not continue service on the NWP.

1964 flood damage 

The catastrophic Christmas flood of 1964 destroyed  of the railroad in Northern California, including three bridges over the Eel River, and permanently changed the topography of the area. The line was closed for 177 days while 850 men rebuilt the railroad through the Eel River canyon. The line was reopened on 16 June 1965. In the years following the 1964 flood, the rail line was less reliable due to increased landsliding in the Eel River Canyon; but freight traffic remained high until the 1970s, as improvements to US Highway 101 cut hauling times, making trucking competitive with the rail line.  An example of a 1970s work day on the NWP might look something like the following: During the final decade of Southern Pacific operation, carloads of lumber left Eureka each morning pulled by six EMD SD9 locomotives called "Cadillacs" by their crews.  The train might pick up a refrigerator car of butter from Fernbridge and more lumber cars from Fortuna and Scotia before making a meal stop for its crew at the Fort Seward depot.  More lumber cars might be added at Alderpoint during the long, gentle climb up the Eel River canyon.  A second crew took over at Willits, where more cars from the California Western typically swelled the train to approximately one hundred cars.  Five miles of 2.25 percent grade from Willits to Ridge originally required helpers, but six "Cadillacs" typically moved the train from Willits to Ridge in two sections during later years.  The remaining trip down the Russian River to Schellville included a meal stop for the crew at Geyserville.

1978 tunnel fire 
Many Humboldt County mills began shipping lumber in trucks when a fire caused collapse of the Island Mountain tunnel, or tunnel 27, closing the line north of Willits on 6 September 1978, and only half of that traffic returned to the rails when the line reopened on 10 December 1979.  Remaining traffic revenues were insufficient for track maintenance through the Eel River Canyon, at that time the most expensive stretch of rail line in the United States. In September 1983, the SP announced that it was shutting down the maintenance-intensive NWP line north of Willits.  This led to a contentious court battle since the SP did not properly notify the Interstate Commerce Commission of their intent to abandon the line. The line was ordered reopened by the U.S. Circuit Court in March 1984.

Sales and shortline development 
In 1984, the SP sold the north end from Willits to Eureka to Bryan Whipple, who ran it as the Eureka Southern Railroad under the reporting marks EUKA. The Eureka Southern operated freight trains and revamped tourist train service until bankrupted by storm damage in the Eel River Canyon.

North Coast Railroad Authority (1989-2022)

The California Legislature formed the NCRA in 1989 to save the NWP from total abandonment. NCRA purchased the Eureka Southern in 1992 and leased the line to the newly formed North Coast Railroad which operated until late 1996, when severe flooding of the Eel River led to widespread landslide damage and destruction of roadbed which remained unrepaired as of 2020. The Federal Railroad Administration (FRA) prohibited any train operation north of Willits in 1998. This order was amended in 1999 to allow the connecting California Western Railroad to resume operation to Willits Depot and turn trains on the wye at Willits Yard.

While Golden Gate Bridge, Highway and Transportation District began purchasing sections of the NWP's south end from the SP, and SP began to lease the line to the California Northern Railroad (CFNR). CFNR operated one train from Willits to Hopland, where freight cars were transferred to a second train from Hopland to Schellville. The track from Lombard to Healdsburg is owned by SMART, and the CFNR had trackage rights granted from Schellville to Willits.

When the CFNR lease was terminated, the NCRA took over operations using EMD GP9 and SD9 locomotives painted in the SP "Black Widow" colors running both freight service and occasional passenger excursion service from 1996 to 1998. The line was plagued by a series of harsh El Nino storms from 1997-1998 causing significant washouts and bridge instability and when coupled with deferred annual and preventative maintenance, ultimately led the FRA to shut down all operations over the entire length of the line, the first and only time it's done so.  The six EMD locomotives were returned to their lessor Omni-trax in 1998.  Former SP SD9s, leased from BUGX, and former North Coast Railroad GP9s, owned by the NCRA, then were pressed into short lived service, ultimately becoming trapped at key points throughout the line by 1999 due to shut downs, washouts, and mechanical failure. By 2016, several movements including scrapping of former equipment in Eureka and returning of leased and privately stored equipment in Willits, Petaluma and Schellville had begun.

In January 2001, the NWP briefly resumed service between Schellville and Cotati using three leased locomotives with reporting mark "NWPY", but service was discontinued in September 2001 because the operator lacked capital to continue operations.

SMART and NWPco (2009–2019) 

In 2009, SMART began initial electrical work on the line which was paralleled by reballasting and replacement of bad ties between Schellville and Windsor. NCRA contracted NWPco, under reporting mark "NWP," reopened the line and began operations in June 2011 over the section of track between Napa and Windsor, California, 62 miles. In July 2011 the first freight train delivered grain to Petaluma. Trains on the NWP run from the Lombard interchange with the California Northern Railroad, up to Windsor. Service consists of about three trips weekly over the line, generally at night to avoid conflict with SMART's daytime-only passenger schedule. The railroad has hauled grain for dairy and poultry farms in Sonoma County, and lumber products out of Windsor and Schellville as well as has provided occasional maintenance of way work for SMART and bulk car storage in Schellville. The only interchange with the national railroad network occurs with the California Northern Railroad in American Canyon.

Regular passenger trains operated by SMART began in late Spring 2017 between Sonoma County Airport and San Rafael, with bus connections to the Larkspur ferry landing and city of Cloverdale. While SMART will eventually extend commuter service to Cloverdale, NCRA and NWPco had plans to open the line to the Skunk Train connection and major yard facility in Willits, but no timeline was established before NCRA was dissolved. Both agencies' plans were dependent on state and federal grants, and the success of the SMART train. Although tourist companies along with local historical groups have expressed interest in possibly opening an excursion and dinner train that would traverse Humboldt and Arcata bays, there are no plans to reopen the Eel River Canyon segment.

SMART (2019 - present) 

Financial disarray and legal troubles beginning before the turn of the millennium have caused the North Coast Rail Authority to fall out of favor with state officials and the public, who have moved to replace the length of the former railroad with pedestrian trails. California's 2018 Great Redwood Trail Act includes detailed plans for investigating and resolving the Authority's debts, dissolving the NCRA, and converting its rights-of-way to rail-trail.

Sonoma–Marin Area Rail Transit (SMART) acquired  from Healdsburg north to the Mendocino-Sonoma County border in September 2020, and in February 2022, took over NWP freight operations, having been approved by the US Surface Transportation Board. Today, NWPco remains contracted by SMART on a quarterly basis until studies on how to best manage the added responsibility of freight service are completed.

Predecessor lines 

 California Midland Railroad extended the Eel River and Eureka Railroad up the Van Duzen River to Carlotta, and was merged into SF&NW in 1903.
 California Northwestern Railway formed in 1898 for Southern Pacific Railroad to assume control of the SF&NP and extend the line from Ukiah to Willits in 1902.  An extension was built from Willits to Sherwood in 1904.  Merged into NWP in 1907.
 California and Northern Railway was formed by Santa Fe Railroad to build north from Eureka to Arcata in 1901, and was merged into SF&NW in 1904.
 Cloverdale and Ukiah Railroad extended the SF&NP from Cloverdale to Ukiah in 1889.
 Eel River and Eureka Railroad connected Humboldt Bay with the Eel River town of Fortuna in 1884, and was merged into SF&NW in 1903.
 Fort Bragg and Southeastern Railroad formed in 1905 for Santa Fe Railroad to assume control of the isolated  Albion River Railroad built in 1891.  Merged into NWP in 1907, but never connected to the remainder of the NWP system.
 Fulton and Guerneville Railroad constructed the  SF&NP branch from Fulton to Guerneville in 1877.
 Marin and Napa Railroad extended the Sonoma Valley narrow-gauge  from Sears Point to connect with the SF&NP at Ignacio in 1888.
 North Pacific Coast Railroad built a  narrow gauge line from Sausalito via the Tomales Bay coast to the Russian River in 1876.  Became North Shore Railroad in 1902.
 North Shore Railroad formed to assume control of the North Pacific Coast narrow-gauge in 1902.  Merged into NWP in 1907.
 Oregon and Eureka Railroad was formed in 1903 for Southern Pacific Railroad to assume control of logging lines around Arcata at the north end of Humboldt Bay.  Selected lines to Trinidad were merged into Northwestern Pacific in 1911.  The Trinidad extension reverted to Hammond Lumber Company control in 1933 and operated as logging branches of the Humboldt Northern Railway until 1948.
 Pacific Lumber Company built  of track in 1885 to connect their mill at Scotia with the Eel River and Eureka Railroad at Alton.  Branch lines were subsequently built up the Eel River; and these lines merged into SF&NW in 1903.
 Petaluma and Haystack Railroad built from Petaluma to Haystack Landing on the Petaluma River in 1864.  Purchased by SF&NP in 1876.
 San Francisco and Eureka Railway formed by Southern Pacific Railroad in 1903 to build a connection from Willits to Eureka.  Merged into NWP in 1907.
 San Francisco and North Pacific Railroad (SF&NP) built from Donahue landing on the Petaluma River to Santa Rosa in 1870 and extended to Cloverdale in 1872.  Extended from Petaluma to San Rafael in 1879.  Extended from San Rafael to Tiburon by the San Francisco & San Rafael in 1884.  Extended from Cloverdale to Ukiah by the Cloverdale & Ukiah in 1889.  Merged in NWP in 1907.
 San Francisco and Northwestern Railway (SF&NW) formed by Santa Fe Railroad in 1903 to consolidate the California and Northern Railway from Arcata to Eureka, the Eel River and Eureka Railroad from Eureka to Alton, The California Midland from Alton to Carlotta, and the Pacific Lumber Company lines from Alton up the Eel River.  Merged into NWP in 1907.
 San Francisco and San Rafael Railroad extended the SF&NP from San Rafael to Tiburon in 1884.
 San Rafael and San Quentin Railroad (SRSQ) was a narrow-gauge railroad formed on 25 February 1869 to connect a ferry landing at Point San Quentin with San Rafael. 
 Santa Rosa, Sebastopol and Green Valley Railroad built the  SF&NP branch from Santa Rosa to Sebastopol in 1890.
 Sonoma and Santa Rosa Railroad extended the Sonoma Valley narrow-gauge from Sonoma to Glen Ellen in 1882.
 Sonoma Valley Prismoidal Railway was an early wooden monorail that was to be built from Petaluma River landing  to Schellville in 1876. However, only the segment from Norfolk landing (later called Wingo) on Sonoma Creek was ever completed. The line ceased operations in May 1877 and was converted to the narrow-gauge Sonoma Valley Railroad beginning in 1878.
 Sonoma Valley Railroad purchased Sonoma Valley Prismoidal Railway in 1878, converted it to a conventional  narrow-gauge, and extended it into Sonoma in 1879.  Extended from Sonoma to Glen Ellen by the Sonoma & Glen Ellen in 1882.  Extended from Sears Point landing to rail connection at Ignacio by Marin & Napa in 1888.

Route 

NWP mileposts conform to Southern Pacific Railroad convention of distance from San Francisco:

 Milepost 40.4 – Schellville (formerly junction with Santa Rosa and Carquinez Railroad)
 Milepost 28.7 – Black Point bridge over Petaluma River
 Milepost 25.8 – Ignacio junction with San Rafael branch
 Milepost 27.8 – Novato
 Milepost 37.2 – Haystack bridge over Petaluma River
 Milepost 38.5 – Petaluma
 Milepost 46.1 – Cotati
 Milepost 53.8 – Santa Rosa
 Milepost 58.5 – Fulton (formerly junction with Guerneville branch)
 Milepost 62.9 – Windsor (Currently the northernmost operational and open point on NWP)
 Milepost 67.6 – bridge over Russian River
 Milepost 68 – Healdsburg
 Milepost 75.8 – Geyserville
 Milepost 85.2 – Cloverdale
 Milepost 100.1 – Hopland
 Milepost 114 – Ukiah
 Milepost 120 – Calpella
 Milepost 122.1 – Redwood Valley
 Milepost 131.4 – Ridge summit between Russian River and Eel River drainages is highest point on line
 Milepost 139.5 – Willits interchange with (formerly Union Lumber Company) California Western Railroad (AKA Skunk Train), which is still operational as a tourist line. A reconnection is planned, but as of late 2022, no timetable for this is in place.
 Milepost 166.5 – line enters Eel River Canyon at Dos Rios
 Milpost 194.8 – bridge over Eel River at south entrance of Island Mountain tunnel
 Milepost 206.5 – bridge over Eel River
 Milepost 209 – Alderpoint
 Milepost 237.7 – South Fork bridge over Eel River
 Milepost 255.6 – Scotia (formerly interchange with Pacific Lumber Company)
 Milepost 261.8 – bridge over Van Duzen River
 Milepost 262.7 – Alton junction with Carlotta Branch
 Milepost 266.1 – Fortuna
 Milepost 271 – Loleta
 Milepost 284.1 – Eureka
 Milepost 292.5 – Arcata
 Milepost 295.2 – Korblex (formerly interchange with Northern Redwood Company Arcata and Mad River Railroad)
 Milepost 300.5 – Samoa (formerly interchange with Hammond Lumber Company Humboldt Northern Railway)

Roster

Steam locomotives

Diesel locomotives 1996–1998

Diesel locomotives 2001

Diesel locomotives post 2006

Narrow-gauge line 

The NWP  narrow-gauge line was built as the North Pacific Coast Railroad in 1873 from a San Francisco ferry connection at Sausalito to the Russian River at Monte Rio. Rails were extended downriver to Duncans Mills in 1876, and up Austin Creek to Cazadero in 1886.  This narrow-gauge line became the Shore Division of the NWP formed by Santa Fe and Southern Pacific in 1907. Freight traffic was heavy as the lower Russian River valley was a major source of redwood lumber for rebuilding San Francisco after the 1906 San Francisco earthquake. The NWP narrow-gauge obtained additional freight cars from the South Pacific Coast Railroad (SPC) as the SPC was converted to standard gauge between 1907 and 1909. Ferries Lagunitas, Ukiah, and Sausalito carried narrow-gauge freight cars across San Francisco Bay from Sausalito to the dual-gauge San Francisco Belt Railroad.

After the flooded Russian River destroyed the  NWP Guerneville branch bridge at Bohemia on 19 March 1907, NWP rebuilt the bridge one-half mile downriver; and extended the Guerneville branch from Monte Rio to Duncans Mills as dual-gauge by 1909. Redwood lumber was then shipped out over the Guerneville branch. A freight transfer shed was built at San Anselmo so narrow-gauge tracks could be removed from the ferries in 1910; and more than half of the narrow-gauge freight cars were scrapped by 1912. A daily freight train operated from Occidental to San Anselmo in the morning and returned to Occidental in the afternoon. The train included a coach for Sonoma County students attending school in Tomales. A freight engine stationed at Duncans Mills was operated by the Guerneville branch freight crew as needed to bring infrequent freight down from Cazadero for transfer to the Guerneville branch until the line up Austin Creek to Cazadero was standard-gauged in 1926.

Summer tourists from San Francisco still visited Russian River vacation spots via joint narrow-gauge/standard-gauge NWP "triangle" excursions until 1927 when automobile travel became more popular. Standard-gauging of the southern end of the line from San Francisco Bay to Point Reyes Station at the head of Tomales Bay was completed on 5 April 1920. Freight service between Point Reyes Station and Occidental was reduced to thrice weekly with freight transfer at Point Reyes Station. Lumber production from the lower Russian River valley was ended by a wildfire on 17 September 1923. After the standard-gauge line was extended to Cazadero, service north of Point Reyes was reduced to a daily (except Sunday) mixed train to Camp Meeker and return until the last narrow-gauge train ran on 29 March 1930; and the remaining narrow-gauge line between Monte Rio and Point Reyes Station was dismantled that autumn. The route of the dual-gauge line from Fulton to Duncan Mills later became the popular River Road connecting all the towns from the coast to the central county.

Route 
Mileposts conform to Southern Pacific Railroad convention of distance from San Francisco.

 Milepost 6.5 – Sausalito
 Milepost 11.7 – tunnel 1
 Milepost 12.6 – Corte Madera
 Milepost 13.4 – Larkspur
 Milepost 14.7 – Kentfield
 Milepost 16.5 – Junction later known as San Anselmo
 Milepost 18.3 – Fairfax
 Milepost 20.7 – tunnel 2
 Milepost 23.1 – Nicasio
 Milepost 27 – bridge over Paper Mill Creek and highway (former hamlet of Taylorville)
 Milepost 35.6 – Arroyo San Geronimo trestle
 Milepost 36.4 – Point Reyes Station
 Milepost 45.4 – Marshall
 Milepost 50.5 – bridge over Keyes Creek
 Milepost 51.9 – tunnel 3
 Milepost 53.1 – Tomales
 Milepost 53.7 – tunnel 4
 Milepost 54.9 – Stemple Creek trestle
 Milepost 58.8 – Estero Americano Creek trestle
 Milepost 59.5 – Valley Ford
 Milepost 61.9 – Ebabias Creek trestle
 Milepost 62.2 – Bodega Road crossing
 Milepost 62.7 – Salmon Creek trestle
 Milepost 63.7 – Freestone
 Milepost 65.2 – Salmon Creek trestle
 Milepost 67.6 – Occidental
 Milepost 68.7 – Maquire Creek trestle
 Milepost 69.0 – Camp Meeker
 Milepost 70.5 – Larry Creek trestle
 Milepost 70.8 – bridge over Dutch Bill Creek
 Milepost 71 – tunnel 5
 Milepost 71.6 – bridge over Dutch Bill Creek
 Milepost 71.7 – bridge over highway
 Milepost 73.8 – Monte Rio
 Milepost 77 – bridge over Russian River
 Milepost 77.1 – Duncans Mills
 Milepost 82.1 – bridge over Austin Creek
 Milepost 84.3 – Cazadero  The D.H. McEwen Lumber Company operated narrow gauge 2-cylinder Shay locomotive C/N 1823 at Cazadero briefly beginning in 1906.

Locomotives

Railroad in film
The Northwestern Pacific Railroad has been featured in several motion pictures and films, thanks to both the historical and scenic backgrounds offered by the route.

Alfred Hitchcock's Shadow of a Doubt'’ was filmed in downtown Santa Rosa, California in the summer of 1942, using the stone depot and railroad yard as a background, as well as stock footage shot from an NWP passenger train.

The NWP trestle at Greenbrae, Marin County, (MP 14.61) was featured in the 1971 film Dirty Harry. Clint Eastwood made a famous jump from the trestle onto a school bus loaded with kidnapped children passing underneath.

Stock footage of a Eureka Southern "North Coast Daylight" train was used in an episode of ABC's TV show "Moonlighting," starring Bruce Willis and Cybill Shepard. The episode, titled "Next Stop Murder," aired on March 19, 1985 and was set on a murder mystery dinner train. Footage used included GP-38 #30 winding through South Fork and Shively, as well as a shot of the train passing through Tunnel #39.

A 1991 television remake of Shadow of a Doubt was filmed at the Petaluma NWP depot, using former Daylight passenger equipment owned by the NCRA and Southern Pacific 6051, loaned from the California State Railroad Museum.

In the 2003 film Cheaper by the Dozen, the Santa Rosa Railroad Square and depot area were used as backdrops.

The film Bloodloss or Day of Vengeance'' utilized the tracks for a filming location just south of Dos Rios in the summer of 2008.

See also

List of U.S. Class I railroads
Sonoma–Marin Area Rail Transit, a commuter line using the Northwestern Pacific's former right-of-way
Eureka Southern Railroad
North Coast Railroad
Arcata and Mad River Railroad
California Western Railroad

Footnotes

References

Further reading

External links 

North Coast Railroad Authority  Current owner of the new Northwestern Pacific
Northwestern Pacific Railroad Historical Society  A non-profit California corporation dedicated to preserving the heritage of Redwood Empire railroading
Railroads and the Redwood Empire   NWP Pictures
Northwestern Pacific Today  A record of the rehabilitation and operation of the NWP starting in 2009
Northwestern Pacific Railroad Network  A social network dedicated to sharing the heritage of Redwood Empire railroading
Northwestern Pacific Railroad Company The official website of the Northwestern Pacific Railroad
Video footage of the Eel River flood
An NWP official's account of flood damage
Northwestern Pacific Railroad Company Records. Yale Collection of Western Americana, Beinecke Rare Book and Manuscript Library.

 
California railroads
3 ft gauge railways in the United States
Narrow gauge railroads in California
Atchison, Topeka and Santa Fe Railway
Predecessors of the Southern Pacific Transportation Company
History of Marin County, California
History of Sonoma County, California
History of the San Francisco Bay Area
Transportation in Humboldt County, California
Transportation in Marin County, California
Transportation in Mendocino County, California
Transportation in Sonoma County, California
Former Class I railroads in the United States
1907 establishments in California
Railway companies established in 1907
Railway companies disestablished in 1992
Railway companies established in 1996
Railway companies disestablished in 2001
Railway companies established in 2007
Interurban railways in California
Non-operating common carrier freight railroads in the United States
Eel River (California)
Eureka, California
American companies established in 1907
American companies established in 2007
Sonoma-Marin Area Rail Transit